José Ronaldo "Ronny" Jarabo Alvarez (born April 7, 1944), is a Puerto Rican politician born and raised by his mother in Cayey, Puerto Rico. He was the Speaker of the Puerto Rico House of Representatives from 1985 to 1992, having served as a member of that legislative body for twenty years, from 1973 to 1992.
Currently, he is an advisor to Puerto Rico Senate Minority Whip José Luis Dalmau and his expertise as a political analyst is tapped by local news media.

Personal life

Jarabo was married to Teresa Bengoa. He has a BA in political science from the University of Puerto Rico. He also graduated from the University of Puerto Rico School of Law in 1972.

His father - José María Jarabo - was executed in Spain on July 4 1959 for four murders committed in 1958.

In 1992, Jarabo was involved in a scandal when he went to the apartment of former beauty queen Elizabeth Zayas and her husband, Frank Kolodziej, to confront him on an alleged extramarital relationship he was having with Bengoa, Jarabo's wife. Jarabo was accused on several charges, including aggression.

References

|-

External links
 

1944 births
Living people
People from Cayey, Puerto Rico
Political commentators
Speakers of the House of Representatives of Puerto Rico
University of Puerto Rico alumni